Pontefract station may refer to one of the following stations in Pontefract, West Yorkshire, England:

 Pontefract Baghill railway station, the least busy of the three, served by trains between Sheffield and York
 Pontefract Monkhill railway station, the busiest station, served by trains between Goole and Leeds/Wakefield
 Pontefract Tanshelf railway station, the most centrally located, served by trains between Goole and Wakefield
 Pontefract bus station, served by local buses and National Express coach routes

See also
 Pontefract line, the railway line serving Monkhill and Tanshelf stations